Tamás Somogyi (born 15 August 1958) is a Hungarian sailor. He competed in the Flying Dutchman event at the 1992 Summer Olympics.

References

External links
 

1958 births
Living people
Hungarian male sailors (sport)
Olympic sailors of Hungary
Sailors at the 1992 Summer Olympics – Flying Dutchman
Sportspeople from Székesfehérvár